A passerine is any bird of the order Passeriformes (from Latin  'sparrow' and  '-shaped'), which includes more than half of all bird species. Sometimes known as perching birds, passerines are distinguished from other orders of birds by the arrangement of their toes (three pointing forward and one back), which facilitates perching.

With more than 140 families and some 6,500 identified species, Passeriformes is the largest clade of birds and among the most diverse clades of terrestrial vertebrates, representing 60% of birds. Passerines are divided into three clades: Acanthisitti (New Zealand wrens), Tyranni (suboscines), and Passeri (oscines or songbirds). The passerines contain several groups of brood parasites such as the viduas, cuckoo-finches, and the cowbirds. Most passerines are omnivorous, while the shrikes are carnivorous.

The terms "passerine" and "Passeriformes" are derived from the scientific name of the house sparrow, Passer domesticus, and ultimately from the Latin term passer, which refers to sparrows and similar small birds.

Description
The order is divided into three suborders, Tyranni (suboscines), Passeri (oscines or songbirds), and the basal Acanthisitti. Oscines have the best control of their syrinx muscles among birds, producing a wide range of songs and other vocalizations, though some of them, such as the crows, do not sound musical to human beings.  Some, such as the lyrebird, are accomplished mimics. The New Zealand wrens are tiny birds restricted to New Zealand, at least in modern times; they were long placed in Passeri.

Most passerines are smaller than typical members of other avian orders. The superb lyrebird and some birds-of-paradise, due to very long tails or tail coverts, are longer overall.

Anatomy
The foot of a passerine has three toes directed forward and one toe directed backward, called anisodactyl arrangement, and the hind toe (hallux) joins the leg at approximately the same level as the front toes. This arrangement enables passerine birds to easily perch upright on branches. The toes have no webbing or joining, but in some cotingas, the second and third toes are united at their basal third.

The leg of passerine birds contains an additional special adaptation for perching. A tendon in the rear of the leg running from the underside of the toes to the muscle behind the tibiotarsus will automatically be pulled and tighten when the leg bends, causing the foot to curl and become stiff when the bird lands on a branch. This enables passerines to sleep while perching without falling off.

Most passerine birds have 12 tail feathers but the superb lyrebird has 16, and several spinetails in the family Furnariidae have 10, 8, or even 6, as is the case of Des Murs's wiretail. Species adapted to tree trunk climbing such as woodcreeper and treecreepers have stiff tail feathers that are used as props during climbing. Extremely long tails used as sexual ornaments are shown by species in different families. A well-known example is the long-tailed widowbird.

Eggs and nests

The chicks of passerines are altricial: blind, featherless, and helpless when hatched from their eggs. Hence, the chicks require extensive parental care. Most passerines lay colored eggs, in contrast with nonpasserines, most of whose eggs are white except in some ground-nesting groups such as Charadriiformes and nightjars, where camouflage is necessary, and in some parasitic cuckoos, which match the passerine host's egg. The vinous-throated parrotbill has two egg colors, white and blue, to deter the brood parasitic common cuckoo.

Clutches vary considerably in size: some larger passerines of Australia such as lyrebirds and scrub-robins lay only a single egg, most smaller passerines in warmer climates lay between two and five, while in the higher latitudes of the Northern Hemisphere, hole-nesting species like tits can lay up to a dozen and other species around five or six.
The family Viduidae do not build their own nests, instead, they lay eggs in other birds' nests.

Origin and evolution
The evolutionary history of the passerine families and the relationships among them remained rather mysterious until the late 20th century. In many cases, passerine families were grouped together on the basis of morphological similarities that, it is now believed, are the result of convergent evolution, not a close genetic relationship. For example, the wrens of the Americas and Eurasia, those of Australia, and those of New Zealand, look superficially similar and behave in similar ways, yet belong to three far-flung branches of the passerine family tree; they are as unrelated as it is possible to be while remaining Passeriformes.

Advances in molecular biology and improved paleobiogeographical data gradually are revealing a clearer picture of passerine origins and evolution that reconciles molecular affinities, the constraints of morphology and the specifics of the fossil record. The first passerines are now thought to have evolved in Gondwana (in the Southern Hemisphere) in the late Paleocene or early Eocene, around 50 million years ago.

The initial split was between the New Zealand wrens (Acanthisittidae) and all other passerines (Eupasserine), and the second split involved the Tyranni (suboscines) and the Passeri (oscines or songbirds). A rupture of the Gondwanan continent caused the core split of the Eupasseres, which were divided into these groups, one in Western Gondwana (Tyranni) and the other in Eastern Gondwana (Passeri). Passeri experienced a great radiation of forms out of the Australian continent. A major branch of the Passeri, parvorder Passerida, expanded deep into Eurasia and Africa, where a further explosive radiation of new lineages occurred. This eventually led to three major Passerida lineages comprising about 4,000 species, which in addition to the Corvida and numerous minor lineages make up songbird diversity today. Extensive biogeographical mixing happens, with northern forms returning to the south, southern forms moving north, and so on.

Fossil record

Earliest passerines

Perching bird osteology, especially of the limb bones, is rather diagnostic. However, the early fossil record is poor because the first Passeriformes were relatively small, and their delicate bones did not preserve well. Queensland Museum specimens F20688 (carpometacarpus) and F24685 (tibiotarsus) from Murgon, Queensland, are fossil bone fragments initially assigned to Passeriformes. However, the material is too fragmentary and their affinities have been questioned. Several more recent fossils from the Oligocene of Europe, such as Wieslochia, Jamna, Resoviaornis and Crosnoornis, are more complete and definitely represent early passeriforms, although their exact position in the evolutionary tree is not known.

From the Bathans Formation at the Manuherikia River in Otago, New Zealand, MNZ S42815 (a distal right tarsometatarsus of a tui-sized bird) and several bones of at least one species of saddleback-sized bird have recently been described. These date from the Early to Middle Miocene (Awamoan to Lillburnian, 19–16 mya).

Early European passerines
 
In Europe, perching birds are not too uncommon in the fossil record from the Oligocene onward, but most are too fragmentary for a more definite placement:
 Wieslochia (Early Oligocene of Frauenweiler, Germany)
 Resoviaornis (Early Oligocene of Wola Rafałowska, Poland)
 Jamna (Early Oligocene of Jamna Dolna, Poland)
 Winnicavis (Early Oligocene of Lower Silesian Voivodeship, Poland)
 Crosnoornis (Early Oligocene of Poland)
 Passeriformes gen. et sp. indet. (Early Oligocene of Luberon, France) – suboscine or basal
 Passeriformes gen. et spp. indet. (Late Oligocene of France) – several suboscine and oscine taxa
 Passeriformes gen. et spp. indet. (Middle Miocene of France and Germany) – basal?
 Passeriformes gen. et spp. indet. (Sajóvölgyi Middle Miocene of Mátraszőlős, Hungary) – at least 2 taxa, possibly 3; at least one probably Oscines.
 Passeriformes gen. et sp. indet. (Middle Miocene of Felsőtárkány, Hungary) – oscine?
Passeriformes gen. et sp. indet. (Late Miocene of Polgárdi, Hungary) – Sylvioidea (Sylviidae? Cettiidae?)

That suboscines expanded much beyond their region of origin is proven by several fossil from Germany such as a broadbill (Eurylaimidae) humerus fragment from the Early Miocene (roughly 20 mya) of Wintershof, Germany, the Late Oligocene carpometacarpus from France listed above, and Wieslochia, among others. Extant Passeri super-families were quite distinct by that time and are known since about 12–13 mya when modern genera were present in the corvoidean and basal songbirds. The modern diversity of Passerida genera is known mostly from the Late Miocene onwards and into the Pliocene (about 10–2 mya). Pleistocene and early Holocene lagerstätten (<1.8 mya) yield numerous extant species, and many yield almost nothing but extant species or their chronospecies and paleosubspecies.

American fossils

In the Americas, the fossil record is more scant before the Pleistocene, from which several still-existing suboscine families are documented. Apart from the indeterminable MACN-SC-1411 (Pinturas Early/Middle Miocene of Santa Cruz Province, Argentina), an extinct lineage of perching birds has been described from the Late Miocene of California, United States: the Palaeoscinidae with the single genus Palaeoscinis. "Palaeostruthus" eurius (Pliocene of Florida) probably belongs to an extant family, most likely passeroidean.

Systematics and taxonomy

The Passeriformes is currently divided into three suborders: Acanthisitti (New Zealand wrens), Tyranni (suboscines) and Passeri (oscines or songbirds). The Passeri is now subdivided into two major groups recognized now as Corvides and Passerida respectively containing the large superfamilies Corvoidea and Meliphagoidea, as well as minor lineages, and the superfamilies Sylvioidea, Muscicapoidea, and Passeroidea but this arrangement has been found to be oversimplified. Since the mid-2000s, studies have investigated the phylogeny of the Passeriformes and found that many families from Australasia traditionally included in the Corvoidea actually represent more basal lineages within oscines. Likewise, the traditional three-superfamily arrangement within the Passeri has turned out to be far more complex and will require changes in classification.

Major "wastebin" families such as the Old World warblers and Old World babblers have turned out to be paraphyletic and are being rearranged. Several taxa turned out to represent highly distinct lineages, so new families had to be established, some of them – like the stitchbird of New Zealand and the Eurasian bearded reedling – monotypic with only one living species. In the Passeri alone, a number of minor lineages will eventually be recognized as distinct superfamilies. For example, the kinglets constitute a single genus with less than 10 species today but seem to have been among the first perching bird lineages to diverge as the group spread across Eurasia. No particularly close relatives of them have been found among comprehensive studies of the living Passeri, though they might be fairly close to some little-studied tropical Asian groups. Nuthatches, wrens, and their closest relatives are currently grouped in a distinct super-family Certhioidea.

Taxonomic list of Passeriformes families

This list is in taxonomic order, placing related families next to one another. The families listed are those recognised by the International Ornithologists' Union (IOC). The order and the division into infraorders, parvorders and superfamilies follows the phylogenetic analysis published by Carl Oliveros and colleagues in 2019. The relationships between the families in the suborder Tyranni (suboscines) were all well determined but some of the nodes in Passeri (oscines or songbirds) were unclear owing to the rapid splitting of the lineages.

Suborder Acanthisitti
 Acanthisittidae: New Zealand wrens

Suborder Tyranni (suboscines)
Infraorder Eurylaimides: Old World suboscines

Infraorder Tyrannides: New World suboscines
Parvorder Furnariida

Parvorder Tyrannida

Suborder Passeri (oscines or songbirds)

 Atrichornithidae: scrub-birds
 Menuridae: lyrebirds
 Climacteridae: Australian treecreepers
 Ptilonorhynchidae: bowerbirds
 Maluridae: fairywrens, emu-wrens and grasswrens
 Dasyornithidae: bristlebirds
 Pardalotidae: pardalotes
 Acanthizidae: scrubwrens, thornbills, and gerygones
 Meliphagidae: honeyeaters
 Pomatostomidae: pseudo-babblers
 Orthonychidae: logrunners

 Infraorder Corvides – previously known as the parvorder Corvida
 Cinclosomatidae: jewel-babblers, quail-thrushes
 Campephagidae: cuckooshrikes and trillers
 Mohouidae: whiteheads
 Neosittidae: sittellas
Superfamily Orioloidea
 Psophodidae: whipbirds
 Eulacestomatidae: wattled ploughbill
 Falcunculidae: shriketit
 Oreoicidae: Australo-Papuan bellbirds
 Paramythiidae: painted berrypeckers
 Vireonidae: vireos
 Pachycephalidae: whistlers
 Oriolidae: Old World orioles and figbirds
Superfamily Malaconotoidea

 Machaerirhynchidae: boatbills
 Artamidae: woodswallows, butcherbirds, currawongs, and Australian magpie
 Rhagologidae: mottled berryhunter
 Malaconotidae: puffback shrikes, bush shrikes, tchagras, and boubous
 Pityriaseidae: bristlehead
 Aegithinidae: ioras
 Platysteiridae: wattle-eyes and batises
 Vangidae: vangas
Superfamily Corvoidea
 Rhipiduridae: fantails
 Dicruridae: drongos
 Monarchidae: monarch flycatchers
 Ifritidae: blue-capped ifrit
 Paradisaeidae: birds-of-paradise
 Corcoracidae: white-winged chough and apostlebird
 Melampittidae: melampittas
 Laniidae: shrikes
 Platylophidae: jayshrike
 Corvidae: crows, ravens, and jays

 Infraorder Passerides – previously known as the parvorder Passerida
 Cnemophilidae: satinbirds
 Melanocharitidae: berrypeckers and longbills
 Callaeidae: New Zealand wattlebirds
 Notiomystidae: stitchbird
 Petroicidae: Australian robins
 Eupetidae: rail-babbler
 Picathartidae: rockfowl
 Chaetopidae: rock-jumpers

 Parvorder Sylviida – previously known as the superfamily Sylviodea
 Hyliotidae: hyliotas
 Stenostiridae: fairy flycatchers
 Paridae: tits, chickadees and titmice
 Remizidae: penduline tits
 Panuridae: bearded reedling
 Alaudidae: larks
 Nicatoridae: nicators
 Macrosphenidae: crombecs and African warblers
 Cisticolidae: cisticolas and allies

Superfamily Locustelloidea
 Acrocephalidae: reed warblers, Grauer's warbler and allies
 Locustellidae: grassbirds and allies
 Donacobiidae: black-capped donacobius
 Bernieridae: Malagasy warblers
—

 Pnoepygidae: wren-babblers
 Hirundinidae: swallows and martins

Superfamily Sylvioidea
 Pycnonotidae: bulbuls
 Sylviidae: sylviid babblers
 Paradoxornithidae: parrotbills and myzornis
 Zosteropidae: white-eyes
 Timaliidae: tree babblers
 Leiothrichidae: laughingthrushes and allies
 Alcippeidae: Alcippe fulvettas
 Pellorneidae: ground babblers

Superfamily Aegithaloidea
 Phylloscopidae: leaf-warblers and allies
 Hyliidae: hylias
 Aegithalidae: long-tailed tits or bushtits
 Scotocercidae: streaked scrub warbler
 Cettiidae: Cettia bush warblers and allies
 Erythrocercidae: yellow flycatchers

 Parvorder Muscicapida – previously known as the superfamily Muscicapoidea
Superfamily Bombycilloidea
 Dulidae: palmchat
 Bombycillidae: waxwings
 Ptiliogonatidae: silky flycatchers
 Hylocitreidae: hylocitrea
 Hypocoliidae: hypocolius
 Mohoidae: oos

Superfamily Muscicapoidea
 Elachuridae: spotted elachura
 Cinclidae: dippers
 Muscicapidae: Old World flycatchers and chats
 Turdidae: thrushes and allies
 Buphagidae: oxpeckers
 Sturnidae: starlings and rhabdornis
 Mimidae: mockingbirds and thrashers
—

 Regulidae: goldcrests and kinglets
Superfamily Certhioidea
 Tichodromidae: wallcreeper
 Sittidae: nuthatches
 Certhiidae: treecreepers
 Polioptilidae: gnatcatchers
 Troglodytidae: wrens
 Parvorder Passerida – previously known as the superfamily Passeroidea
 Promeropidae: sugarbirds
 Modulatricidae: dapple-throat and allies
 Nectariniidae: sunbirds
 Dicaeidae: flowerpeckers
 Chloropseidae: leafbirds
 Irenidae: fairy-bluebirds
 Peucedramidae: olive warbler
 Urocynchramidae: Przewalski's finch
 Ploceidae: weavers
 Viduidae: indigobirds and whydahs
 Estrildidae: waxbills, munias and allies
 Prunellidae: accentors
 Passeridae: Old World sparrows and snowfinches
 Motacillidae: wagtails and pipits
 Fringillidae: finches and euphonias
Superfamily Emberizoidea – previously known as the New World nine-primaried oscines
 Rhodinocichlidae: rosy thrush-tanager
 Calcariidae: longspurs and snow buntings
 Emberizidae: buntings
 Cardinalidae: cardinals
 Mitrospingidae: mitrospingid tanagers
 Thraupidae: tanagers and allies
 Passerellidae: New World sparrows, bush tanagers
 Parulidae: New World warblers
 Icteriidae: yellow-breasted chat
 Icteridae: grackles, New World blackbirds, and New World orioles
 Calyptophilidae: chat-tanagers
 Zeledoniidae: wrenthrush
 Teretistridae: Cuban warblers
 Nesospingidae: Puerto Rican tanager
 Spindalidae: spindalises
 Phaenicophilidae: Hispaniolan tanagers

Phylogeny
Relationships between living Passeriformes families based on the phylogenetic analysis of Oliveros et al (2019). Some terminals have been renamed to reflect families recognised by the IOC but not in that study. The IOC families Alcippeidae and Teretistridae were not sampled in this study.

Explanatory notes

References

Further reading

 Supporting information

External links

 
Extant Eocene first appearances
Taxa named by Carl Linnaeus